Singureni is a village in Rîșcani District, Moldova.

Notable people
 Leonid Bujor

References

Villages of Rîșcani District